Chakhon Philakhlang (born 8 March 1998) is a Thai professional footballer who plays as a goalkeeper for Thai League 2 club Nakhon Si United.

Honours

International
Thailand U-19
 AFF U-19 Youth Championship: 2015

External links
 

1998 births
Living people
Chakhon Philakhlang
Chakhon Philakhlang
Association football goalkeepers
Chakhon Philakhlang
Chakhon Philakhlang
Chakhon Philakhlang
Nakhon Si United F.C. players